C. Shanmugavelu is an Indian politician and former member of Tamil Nadu Legislative Assembly elected from Madathukulam constituency in 2011. Previously, he was elected to the Tamil Nadu legislative assembly as an Anna Dravida Munnetra Kazhagam candidate from Udumalpet constituency in 2001 and 2006 elections in which he served as a minister for a short period.

Shanmugavelu was sacked as Minister for Rural Industries in November 2011 as part of the third cabinet reshuffle in a five-month period by Chief Minister Jayalalithaa.

See also
Politics of India

References 

All India Anna Dravida Munnetra Kazhagam politicians
Living people
Year of birth missing (living people)
Amma Makkal Munnetra Kazhagam politicians
Tamil Nadu MLAs 2011–2016